Elachista bazaella is a moth of the family Elachistidae that is found in Spain.

References

bazaella
Moths described in 1992
Endemic fauna of Spain
Moths of Europe